Baetisca laurentina is a species of armored mayfly in the family Baetiscidae. It is found in North America.

References

Mayflies
Articles created by Qbugbot
Insects described in 1932